Jerome W. "Jerry" Mertens (born January 5, 1936 in Racine, Wisconsin) is a former American football cornerback who played eight seasons in the National Football League for the San Francisco 49ers.

Biography 
Mertens, a high-school standout at Racine Saint Catherine's, graduated from Drake University in 1958, and received the Holmes Cowper Trophy, which is given to the graduating letter-winner who has the highest grade-point average. In the 1958 draft he was selected as the 239th pick by the San Francisco 49ers. His rookie season he was selected to the NFL Pro Bowl. Mertens was officially a member of the 49ers during the 1966 season, although his career was over.  Jerry ended his own career when he delivered a bone crushing hit to Jim Taylor for a six-yard loss, which resulted in him breaking his neck.  He was forced to sit on the sidelines for the remainder of the game.  The doctors had failed in finding the fractured bones, until the next day when he had awoken from chronic pain in his neck.  He spent nine months in a full body cast, but eventually had a full recovery.  After retiring at the age of 30, Mertens settled into a career as a fertilizer broker and working for kids' programs as a member of the NFL Alumni. Jerry was inducted into St. Catherine's High School's Athletic Hall of Fame in 1998, and the Racine County Sports Hall of Fame in 2013.

He and his wife Karen also helped raise his three children – Gregory, Debbie and Lauri – and now had four grandchildren (Jamie, Stephanie, Scott, and Gregory) in the San Francisco bay area. He also eventually became president of the NFL Alumni Association, a position he held for over 10 years.

References

1936 births
Living people
American people of Dutch descent
Sportspeople from Racine, Wisconsin
Players of American football from Wisconsin
American football cornerbacks
San Francisco 49ers players
Western Conference Pro Bowl players
Drake University alumni
Drake Bulldogs football players